Growing Up bin Laden: Osama's Wife and Son Take Us Inside Their Secret World is a 2009 book based on interviews with a wife and son of Osama bin Laden.

References

2009 non-fiction books
American biographies
Books about al-Qaeda
Works about Osama bin Laden
St. Martin's Press books